Rothwell Temperance Band (RTB) are a Championship Section brass band in Yorkshire. Although they do not rehearse in Rothwell itself, they have strong connections with the town and hold many concerts for the local community.

The band were crowned Yorkshire Region Champions at St George's Hall in Bradford on 8 March 2009. In March 2012, they qualified for the National Championships at London's Royal Albert Hall for the 5th consecutive year.

Early history

Formation
In the mid-19th century a band called the Rothwell Model Band existed in the town. Later, a dispute arose between the alcohol drinkers and the teetotallers in the band. As a result, the Rothwell Temperance Band was founded in 1881. When the Temperance Hall was built in 1904 one of the four cornerstones was inscribed with the following:

Laid by Thomas Blackburn in the name of the Rothwell Temperance Band. Established 1881.

The Rothwell Model Band then became known as the Rothwell Old Band.

Early years

After the 1939-45 war

Changing names
In 1999 the band was renamed the Wallace Arnold (Rothwell) Band, reflecting sponsorship by coach tour operator Wallace Arnold.  The then "B" band retained the name Rothwell Temperance Band and is the current band.

In 2000 the Wallace Arnold (Rothwell) Band merged with the Yorkshire Imperial Band, which for some time became the Yorkshire Imperial DUT (Rothwell) Band.

Recent history

Major contest successes
In true brass band style only top six placings are listed. For these and other contest results see the Results Archive section on 4barsrest.com.

Notable members
Richard Marshall played cornet with the band in the early 1990s and is now principal cornet player with the Black Dyke Band.
Tom Hutchinson played Principal Cornet with the band for over 4 years before joining Black Dyke Band in 2005. He is now Principal Cornet of the top ranked Cory Band in Wales
Michael Howley grew up playing euphonium with the band and has held the principal euphonium seat at several top bands including The Fairey Band, YBS and Brighouse and Rastrick.
David Roberts (conductor) was principal cornet player with the band in his youth before playing with Yorkshire Imps and Black Dyke Band. He then returned to Rothwell to concentrate on conducting.
Lucy Beeson is a regular percussionist with the band. She competed in the final of the BBC Young Musician of the Year in 2004, having won the percussion class.
Labour Politician, James Normington, played cornet in the band for 7 years.

Tours and performances
The band have featured several times on BBC Radio 2's Listen To The Band programme, using tracks from the band's CDs and having recorded sessions especially for broadcast.

In the late 1990s the Band toured Norway, visiting Bergen and the surrounding area

References

External links
 Official Rothwell Temperance Band website

British instrumental musical groups
British brass bands
Musical groups from West Yorkshire